Ristigouche-Partie-Sud-Est is a township municipality in Quebec, Canada near the head of the Baie de Chaleur. It is a rural township without population centres, situated along the CN Railway line which hosts the VIA Rail Ocean (train) route; the nearest VIA station is Matapedia.

History

At the beginning of the 19th century, the voyage between Quebec and Saint John passed the Temiscouata Portage and via the Saint John River valley.  After the War of 1812, it was decided to develop a new maritime route which was to be located away from the border. The Matapedia River valley was selected, and the route would be named Kempt Road, for General Sir James Kempt, then Governor-General of British North America.  Construction started in 1830, under the supervision of William MacDonald, Frederic Fournier and Major Wolfe, but the route remained difficult and government decided to abandon it in 1857. A new path between Causapscal and the Restigouche was adopted in 1862, and in 1868 the Intercolonial Railway project that was to transform the British North American Colonies into Canada selected the Matapedia River road to be its route.  On 1 July 1876, the Sainte-Flavie-Campbellton section was opened.

The municipality was formed in 1907 when it separated from the Township Municipality of Ristigouche (now Saint-André-de-Restigouche).

On 17 April 1983, the  Ristigouche Ecological Reserve was formed by the Quebec government.

In March 2013, the municipality was served notice of pursuit by the resource extractor Gastem for $1.5 million because the municipality sought to protect its drinking water source from fracking, by imposing an exclusion zone of 2 km around water wells. Gastem offered an amicable resolution at that time for that cost. Ultimately, a judge of the Superior Court of Quebec ruled in the township's favour in 2017.

Demographics 

Mother tongue:
 English as first language: 17.1%
 French as first language: 77.1%
 English and French as first language: 5.7%
 Other as first language: 0%

See also
 List of township municipalities in Quebec

References

External links
Restigouche South-East Municipality (French)

Incorporated places in Gaspésie–Îles-de-la-Madeleine
Township municipalities in Quebec